The University Hospital of Düsseldorf is located in the south of Düsseldorf, the state capital of the German state of North Rhine-Westphalia and center of the populous Rhine-Ruhr metropolitan region. It treats approximately 45,000 inpatients and 300,000 outpatients every year in 32 clinics and 34 institutes. The hospital has more than 1,200 inpatient beds. It has roughly 5,500 employees, including 1,300 nurses and 800 physicians. Many facilities are self-operated (crafts, training centers). The board consists of the medical director, the commercial director, the director of nursing and the dean of the medical faculty.

See also 
 Universitäts-Augenklinik Düsseldorf
 University of Düsseldorf

External links 
 

Teaching hospitals in Germany
Heinrich Heine University Düsseldorf
Medical and health organisations based in North Rhine-Westphalia